The Ansel T. Walling House is a historic house in Circleville, Ohio, United States.  An Italianate structure that was built in 1869, it was the home of Ansel T. Walling, a state and federal legislator.

A native of New York, Walling settled in northeastern Ohio in 1843, where he began to publish a local newspaper.  After serving as a clerk for the Ohio House of Representatives, he and his wife Sarah moved to Circleville in 1863; there they bought land and soon began to erect a house.  Completed in 1869, its brick walls rest on a foundation of sandstone and are covered with an asphalt roof.  Elements such as a bracketed cornice and a pitched roof with prominent eaves make the house distinctively Italianate; it is one of Circleville's best Italianate houses.

Major dates in the Walling House's history include Walling's death in 1896, his widow's death in 1922, and its designation as a historic site in 1987.  In that year, the house was listed on the National Register of Historic Places, qualifying because of its connection to Walling and because of its well-preserved historic architecture.  Two other houses in the same block, known as the Morris and William Marshall Houses, are also listed on the National Register.

References

Houses completed in 1869
Circleville, Ohio
Houses in Pickaway County, Ohio
Houses on the National Register of Historic Places in Ohio
Italianate architecture in Ohio
National Register of Historic Places in Pickaway County, Ohio
1869 establishments in Ohio